Cuthbert Historic District, in Cuthbert in Randolph County, Georgia, is a  historic district which was listed on the National Register of Historic Places in 1975.

It is centered around U.S. 82 and U.S. 27.  It includes Greek Revival, Gothic, and Plantation Plain architecture.  It includes a courthouse, a college, a hotel, and other properties among its 34 contributing buildings.

The district includes many of the oldest houses in Cuthbert.  It includes
David Rumph Colonial Inn (1837),
Taylor-Bussey-Castellow House (1846)
Key House (1842), 305 College Street, built by Jesse Bibb Key with use of his slaves brought from Virginia
Atkins-Stanford House (1850)
Douglas-Coffin House (1840s)
Gunn Brown House
Harris-Whatley House (1849)

Gallery

References

Historic districts on the National Register of Historic Places in Georgia (U.S. state)
Greek Revival architecture in Georgia (U.S. state)
Gothic Revival architecture in Georgia (U.S. state)
National Register of Historic Places in Randolph County, Georgia